On 18 March 2015, two militants attacked the Bardo National Museum in the Tunisian capital city of Tunis, and took hostages. Twenty-one people, mostly European tourists, were killed at the scene, and an additional victim died ten days later. Around fifty others were injured. The two gunmen, Tunisian citizens Yassine Labidi and Saber Khachnaoui, were killed by police. Police treated the event as a terrorist attack.

The Islamic State of Iraq and the Levant (ISIL) claimed responsibility for the attack, and threatened to commit further attacks. However, the Tunisian government blamed a local splinter group of al-Qaeda in the Islamic Maghreb, called the Okba Ibn Nafaa Brigade, for the attack. A police raid killed nine members ten days later.

Background
Since the removal from power of longtime President Zine El Abidine Ben Ali in the 2011 Tunisian Revolution, the country has faced occasional attacks from Islamist militants, mainly in remote areas. Tourism has been important to the nation's economy since its transition to democracy.

Attack
The morning of the attack, the cruise ships  and  docked at the Port of La Goulette. Some of the passengers on board the ships had decided to go to the Bardo Museum. At the time of the attack, more than 200 tourists were present in the vicinity.

The attack began at around 12:30 p.m. At that time, security guards protecting the museum and the nearby Parliament building were absent on a coffee break. The tourists were attacked as they were getting off a bus to enter the Bardo Museum compound. As scores of visitors ran toward the museum to avoid the shooting, the attackers pursued them and took them hostage inside. The siege lasted three hours, ending when security forces breached the building and killed two of the attackers. One policeman was fatally shot during the rescue operation.

Tunisian security forces escorted dozens of tourists up nearby steps and away from the danger, as armed agents pointed guns toward an adjacent building. Many tourists ran in panic to safety, including at least one couple carrying two children.

During the attack, members of Parliament were discussing counter-terrorist legislation when they were ordered to evacuate the building due to the sound of gunfire. They were later forced to lie down on the ground as security forces commenced the rescue operation of hostages.

Aftermath

According to analyst Rita Katz of the SITE Intelligence Group, holders of Twitter accounts associated with ISIL were overjoyed at the attack, urging Tunisians to "follow their brothers". The day following the attack, the Islamic State group issued a statement claiming responsibility for the incident and promising further attacks. Meanwhile, a Twitter account linked to the Islamic State published a photograph of one of the Italian victims; the image, showing Francesco Caldara, has a red cross drawn on it and the words: "Crusader Crushed."

Anti-terrorism protests began in central Tunis after the attack, with crowds reportedly chanting, "Tunisia is free, terrorism out." On 24 March, nearly a week after the attack, the museum held a ceremonial reopening. Simultaneously, thousands of Tunisians and tourists staged a march in Tunis to show their solidarity with the slain victims.

On 29 March, tens of thousands of demonstrators, along with French President François Hollande, Italian Prime Minister Matteo Renzi, and several other world leaders, marched in Tunis under the slogan The World Is Bardo (Le Monde est Bardo) to protest terrorism.

Victims

When the attack ended, nineteen foreign tourists, including four Italians, three French nationals, three Japanese, three Polish nationals, two Spaniards, two Colombians (including one with dual Australian citizenship), one Russian, and one British national were found to have been killed. A Tunisian police officer, and two perpetrators were also reported dead. On 28 March, an injured French woman, Huguette Dupeu, died of her wounds at a hospital.

Over 50 other people were injured, many of them foreign tourists. MSC Crociere S.A. reported that nine of its guests had been killed, and twelve were injured; six visitors, all from MSC Splendida, including two Spaniards, one Belgian, one British national, one French national, and one Japanese were killed. The cruise company said that it would not schedule any further visits to the Port of La Goulette in 2015, choosing Malta as a replacement.

Perpetrators
Yassine Labidi and Saber Khachnaoui, both Tunisian citizens, were identified by Tunisian Prime Minister Habib Essid as the two slain gunmen a day after the attack. Prior to the attack, Labidi lived in the Tunis neighborhood of Ibn Khaldoun, while Khachnaoui was from Kasserine. Labidi moved after the Jasmine Revolution to Sfax for work, and lived there until his death. He worked as a deliveryman for a local business prior to the attack. While Labidi was known to intelligence services, neither of the two men had previously been positively linked to known Tunisian terrorist organisations.

An operation looking for up to three suspected accomplices was launched immediately following the attack. On the following day, nine people were arrested, four for direct links to the cell which carried out the shooting and five for having indirect links to it. Their roles in the attack have not yet been clarified. On 21 March, the number of people arrested reached over twenty, with ten accused of having direct links to the museum attack. On 26 March, authorities arrested twenty-three members of a terror cell linked to the attack.

According to BBC security correspondent Frank Gardner, an al-Qaeda operative claimed the men had spent two months training with militants in Derna, Libya. On 20 March, Tunisian Security Minister Rafik Chelly announced that Labidi and Khachnaoui had received weapons training in Libya from an unspecified group prior to carrying out the attack. According to authorities, they managed to slip past the border to Libya undetected in December.

On 22 March, Tunisian President Beji Caid Essebsi said a third gunman was involved in the attack, and is at large.

On 28 March, Tunisian police killed Lokman Abu Sakhra, an Algerian suspected of planning the attack, along with eight other armed men during a raid in the southern Gafsa region. They were allegedly major members of the Okba Ibn Nafaa Brigade, a splinter group of al-Qaeda in the Islamic Maghreb. Interior Ministry spokesman Mohamed Ali Aroui said, "[T]he nine were among the most dangerous terrorists in Tunisia." Sakhra was said to be the leader of the group. The Tunisian government said the Okba Ibn Nafaa Brigade was responsible for the attack, despite claims of responsibility made by the Islamic State of Iraq and the Levant.

On 20 May, 22-year-old Moroccan illegal immigrant Abdelmajid Touil was arrested in Italy on allegations that he aided the attackers.

In December 2017 US Secretary of State Rex W. Tillerson named Wanas al-Faqih and two other men, as terrorists.  On January 4, 2018, when the State Department listed al-Faqih on its list of globally designated terrorists they described him as having planned the Bardo Museum bombing.

Reactions

Domestic

Tunisian President Beji Caid Essebsi announced via Facebook that he would address the nation later that day. In his address, he called the attack a "huge disaster" and called for Tunisia to prevent such an attack in the future, further saying that the country was in a "war against terrorism". He also pledged for the quick passage of an anti-terrorism law. Prime Minister Habib Essid issued a statement on the "cowardly" attack and called for unity, later chairing an emergency cabinet meeting. Essebsi also praised Akil, a one-and-a-half-year-old German Shepherd police dog who was killed in the raid, saying, "It's a victim we don't talk about but it's a heavy loss." On the day following the attack, Essebsi ordered the deployment of Tunisian troops to the country's major cities as a security precaution.

International
Australian Foreign Affairs Minister Julie Bishop called the incident a "terrorist attack on a fledgling democracy", and Prime Minister Tony Abbott sent his condolences to the family of an Australian killed in the attack. British Foreign Secretary Philip Hammond described the killings as a "cowardly terrorist attack", whilst Prime Minister David Cameron described the incident as "appalling and brutal". Colombian President Juan Manuel Santos lamented the death of the two Colombians killed in the attack and expressed his solidarity with their families; the foreign ministry added a statement. French Prime Minister Manuel Valls condemned the attack. Italian Prime Minister Matteo Renzi condemned the attack and emphasized that Italy is close to the Tunisian government. President Sergio Mattarella condemned the attack as "a fact of unprecedented violence". The Japanese government condemned the attack as "despicable", while Prime Minister Shinzō Abe, in addition to his own condemnation, stated that Tokyo was working to collect further information. The Ministry of Foreign Affairs and Cooperation of Spain condemned the attack in a press release.

Condolences and outrage were expressed by other states, including the Holy See, Mexico, the Sahrawi Arab Democratic Republic, Singapore, Syria, Turkey, and the United States.

Memorials 

On 4 March 2019, a memorial to the British victim, and those of the 2015 Sousse attacks, called Infinite Wave, was unveiled in Cannon Hill Park, Birmingham, England, by Prince Harry, Duke of Sussex.

See also
 List of terrorist incidents, 2015
 List of terrorist incidents in Tunisia

References

Further reading
 Turmoil in Libya Strengthening Extremism in Tunisia. Oxford University Professor Mohamed-Salah Omri "analyses the attacks in Tunis and why an estimated 3,000 young people have left Tunisia to join the IS." (19 March 2015)

2015 mass shootings in Africa
2015 murders in Tunisia
21st century in Tunis
Arab Winter in Tunisia
Attacks on museums
Attacks on tourists
Deaths by firearm in Tunisia
Hostage taking in Africa
ISIL terrorist incidents in Tunisia
Islamic terrorist incidents in 2015
March 2015 crimes in Africa
March 2015 events in Africa
Mass murder in 2015
Mass murder in Tunisia
Murder in Tunis
Terrorist incidents attributed to al-Qaeda in the Islamic Maghreb
Terrorist incidents in Tunis
Terrorist incidents in Tunisia in 2015
Colombia–Tunisia relations
France–Tunisia relations
Italy–Tunisia relations
Japan–Tunisia relations
Poland–Tunisia relations
Russia–Tunisia relations
Spain–Tunisia relations
Tunisia–United Kingdom relations